The Algerian professional football awards is a collection of football awards given at the end of each season since 2008. Back then, the only award was the Manager of the Year. There are now 3 awards: Footballer, Goalkeeper and Manager. The previous fourth award, the Young Footballer of the Year Award, has no longer been handed out since 2008. The voters are all the players from the Algerian Ligue Professionnelle 1 as well as the Algerian footballers playing abroad at the highest level. The ceremony is organized together by the paper Maracana Foot and the Algerian Football Federation.

Palmares

Professional Footballer of the Year

Young Professional Footballer of the Year

Professional Goalkeeper of the Year

Professional Manager of the Year

References
  maracanafoot.com

References

Professional football awards
Association football trophies and awards by country
2008 establishments in Algeria
Awards established in 2008
Annual events in Algeria